Vorontsov is a Russian noble family.

Vorontsov (Russian: Воронцов) or Vorontsova (feminine: Воронцова) may also refer to:

Nobility
Alexander Vorontsov (1741–1805)
Mikhail Illarionovich Vorontsov (1714–1767)
Mikhail Semyonovich Vorontsov (1782–1856)
Semyon Vorontsov (1744–1832)
Yekaterina Romanovna Vorontsova-Dashkova (1744–1810)
Illarion Vorontsov-Dashkov (1837–1916))

Other people
 Boris Vorontsov-Velyaminov (1904–1994), Russian astrophysicist
 Vasily Vorontsov (1847–1917), Russian economist and sociologist
 Yuli Vorontsov (1929–2007), Russian diplomat
 Yuri Vorontsov (1937–2002), Russian cinematographer

Other uses
 Vorontsov Lighthouse, in the Black Sea port of Odessa, Ukraine

See also
 Vorontsov Palace (disambiguation)
 Woronzow Records, a record label that publishes Ptolemaic Terrascope